Lithocarpus cleistocarpus (common name, tanbark oak) is a species of stone-oak native to China. The flowers are white, and the nuts are flat, contained in a capsule. The tree is grown as an ornamental plant.

References

External links
 Lithocarpus cleistocarpus info
 Lithocarpus cleistocarpus information

cleistocarpus
Flora of China